Rianna Dean (born 21 October 1998) is an English professional footballer who plays as a forward for Crystal Palace in the FA Women's Championship.

Club career

Arsenal 
Dean came through the academy at Arsenal, scoring 37 goals in 20 games in the 2016/17 season with the Development Squad before confirming she was to leave at the end of the campaign in order to seek first team football. She made one senior appearance for the club, making her professional debut on 29 July 2015 in a WSL Cup Group Stage victory over London Bees. Arsenal would go on to lift the trophy.

Millwall Lionesses 
In July 2017, Dean joined Millwall on a one-year contract. She led the team in goals, scoring 10 across all competitions.

Tottenham Hotspur 
Upon the conclusion of her year at Millwall, Dean moved to Tottenham Hotspur for the 2018–19 season. After scoring six goals in three games, including a hat-trick against her former club, Millwall, Dean was voted FA Women's Championship October Player of the Month. She finished the season as the Championship's joint second highest scorer behind only Jessica Sigsworth of Manchester United as Tottenham won promotion to the FA WSL. Dean was one of 11 players retained by the club ahead of their debut season as a top flight professional team. She was released at the end of the 2020–21 season having not scored during her final campaign with the team.

Liverpool 
On 9 July 2021, Dean signed for Liverpool in the FA Women's Championship.

Crystal Palace
Dean was released by Liverpool at the end of the 2021–22 season and subsequently joined Crystal Palace.

International career 
Dean has been capped by England at various youth levels.

In 2015, she represented England at the 2015 UEFA Women's Under-17 Championship. In 2017, she scored twice during a 2017 UEFA Women's Under-19 Championship qualification win over the Czech Republic. In 2019, she was called up by Mo Marley to the U21 squad for the La Manga Tournament.

Career statistics

Club

Honours 
Arsenal
FA WSL Cup: 2015

Liverpool FC
FA Women's Championship: 2021–22

References

External links 
 Tottenham Hotspur player profile
 Rianna Dean on Soccerway

1998 births
Living people
English women's footballers
Arsenal W.F.C. players
Millwall Lionesses L.F.C. players
Tottenham Hotspur F.C. Women players
Liverpool F.C. Women players
Crystal Palace F.C. (Women) players
Women's Super League players
Women's Championship (England) players
Women's association football forwards
England women's youth international footballers
England women's under-21 international footballers
Footballers from Uxbridge